Perry G. Smith Sr. (born April 27, 1949) is Alabama's former Adjutant general.

Education 
Smith attended Auburn University and was commissioned as second lieutenant through its Army ROTC program in 1973. He received a Bachelor of science degree in biochemistry.  He attended Troy University, where he received a master's degree in human resource management.

Career 
Smith served in the Alabama Army National Guard from 1975 to 2008. He later served as Adjutant General from 2011 to 2017.

References

External links 

1949 births
Living people
Auburn University alumni
Troy University alumni
National Guard (United States) generals
United States Army generals